Hamad Madadi (born 7 July 1988) is an Iranian-born Qatari handball player for Al Rayyan and the Qatari national team.

References

1988 births
Living people
Qatari male handball players
Asian Games medalists in handball
Handball players at the 2010 Asian Games
Handball players at the 2014 Asian Games
Qatari people of Iranian descent
Asian Games gold medalists for Qatar
Medalists at the 2014 Asian Games